Focșeneanu is a Romanian surname. Notable people with the surname include:

Dumitru Focșeneanu (1935–2019), Romanian bobsledder
Emilian Focșeneanu (born 1966), Romanian alpine skier 

Romanian-language surnames